Maxamedbuurfuule is a town located in the central Hiran region of Somalia.

References 
Maxamed Buurfuule

Populated places in Hiran, Somalia